Here Is Mariah Carey, also known as Mariah Carey or This Is Mariah Carey, is the third video album by American singer Mariah Carey. It presents Carey performing live at Proctor's Theatre in Schenectady, New York, in July 1993, and also includes non-concert footage. Carey performs ten songs during the video; four are from her third studio album Music Box (1993), which Columbia Records commissioned Here Is Mariah Carey to promote. She is sporadically accompanied by a band, choir, dancers, and string musicians. In creating the stage for the performance, production designers sought inspiration from works by Boris Aronson and Josep Maria Jujol. Lawrence Jordan, who collaborated with Carey on previous occasions, directed the hour-long video.

Approximately 4,500 people attended tapings at Proctor's Theater, and 19 million watched it on television network NBC during its original broadcast on November 25, 1993. Columbia Music Video released it on VHS five days later to generally positive reviews from critics. Although they complimented Carey's voice, many felt the non-concert scenes were redundant. Here Is Mariah Carey peaked at number four on the United States video album chart published by Billboard. Earning a Platinum certification from the Recording Industry Association of America, it was one of the best-selling video albums of 1994 and 1995 in that country. The video also spent six weeks at number one on the Official Charts Company's music videos chart in the United Kingdom.

Background 
In March 1992, following the release of her first and second studio albums Mariah Carey (1990) and Emotions (1991), Mariah Carey performed a concert on the American television program MTV Unplugged. As she had not toured, Carey sought to establish herself as a capable live performer and disprove notions by critics that her voice was manufactured in a studio. After the concert was well received by her fans and critics alike, Carey's record label—Columbia—released it as an extended play, MTV Unplugged. Its first single, "I'll Be There", became her sixth number-one song on the United States Billboard Hot 100 chart.

By the second quarter of 1993, Carey completed recording material for her third album, Music Box. Before its release later that year, her management team negotiated a deal with NBC for a one-hour television special, Here Is Mariah Carey, to promote the album. The show would allow Carey to warm up for her forthcoming Music Box Tour, reach an audience unable to see her on a tour date, and give Columbia the ability to release it as a video album in time for the 1993 Christmas shopping season. To select a venue for the taping, a Sony Music production crew evaluated almost two dozen theaters in four U.S. states. They chose the 2,700-seat Proctor's Theatre in Schenectady, New York, for its grand architecture, strong acoustics, and proximity to Carey's house with newlywed husband Tommy Mottola. In a chapter from her 2020 memoir The Meaning of Mariah Carey, Carey states that she disagreed with the choice: "Even though it was a beautiful, classic theater, it was not the setting I would have chosen, to be sure; nor would most twenty-year-olds in the early 1990s."

Production 

Rather than being sold, 4,500 tickets for the event were distributed by Carey's fan club, local radio stations, and those with connections to the production. Several rows closest to the stage were reserved for fan club members, and two rows in the middle section were removed for a camera dolly. Most of the filming at Proctor's occurred over two nights on July 15 and 16, 1993, with nine cameras using 35mm film. Carey performed the same set list on each night, and performances from both were used for the video. Her performance of "I'll Be There" with 40 children from the Albany Police Athletic League on stage took place beforehand on July 14. Non-concert footage was primarily filmed at Carey's New York estate. Lawrence Jordan—who directed Carey's MTV Unplugged performance and music videos for "Someday" and "I Don't Wanna Cry"—also directed Here Is Mariah Carey. Due to her fans' presence, Carey considers the video's production the first time she realized her level of fame.

Two set designs which are meant to create an operatic yet funky atmosphere adorn the stage for the concert. The first act features monolithic abstract shapes inspired by Boris Aronson's sculptures in the 1958 Broadway production of The Firstborn that are colored blue-gray to complement Carey's skin tone, and the second features several fabrics and drapery. Both include openings that allow light to protrude while a painted cyclorama acts as a background. Platforms of varying heights and wrought iron railings inspired by those of Josep Maria Jujol are also present. An earlier set design plan which called for a revolving stage that would mechanically rotate between the two acts was changed due to camera and budget limitations. The band—which has a near-identical composition to the one in Carey's MTV Unplugged performance—is situated on the left side of the stage while the background singers are on the right, standing in front of the string players.

Summary 
Here Is Mariah Carey switches between scenes of Carey singing in Proctor's Theater and those outside of it. The video begins with Carey telling children from the Albany Police Athletic League to believe in themselves to achieve their dreams. After entering the theater's stage, Carey opens with performances of "Emotions" and "Hero". Her background singers discuss working with her while sitting on a park bench, then Carey sings "Someday" and "Without You". After reminiscing about singing as a child with her mother on the front porch of a building, Carey performs "Make It Happen". In the countryside, she rides a horse and explains her love of nature. Back at the theater, Carey sings "Dreamlover" accompanied by three background dancers, and then "Love Takes Time". While in her house, she cooks pizza with two friends, and they get in a food fight. Afterward, Carey sings "Anytime You Need a Friend" backed by the Refreshing Springs Church Choir. With her friends outside, she discusses her experiences trying to enter the music industry. Carey performs "Vision of Love" and then "I'll Be There" with Trey Lorenz and members of the Albany Police Athletic League on stage. Near the production's wrap party in a grassy field, the band talks about working with her, and Carey and her songwriting partners Walter Afanasieff, David Cole, and Robert Clivillés explain how they collaborate. After Carey discusses the making of the "Dreamlover" music video, it is shown in full.

Broadcast and release 
Here Is Mariah Carey was first shown on November 25, 1993, on NBC. As it aired in the November sweeps period, during which Nielsen ratings are used to determine advertisement prices for subsequent months, Richard Huff of the New York Daily News thought this suggested NBC believed it would draw a large audience. Here Is Mariah Carey received 19 million viewers and a rating and share of 11.0/21, meaning 11 percent of American households with a television watched the program, and 21 percent with one in use were tuned in to the special. Out of the primetime network programs, it ranked third for the night, 34th for the week, and fifth among entertainment specials aired during November sweeps. Sales of Music Box resulting from the broadcast caused the album to reach number one on the Billboard 200 chart for the first time. Outside the United States, the special was broadcast in Australia, Canada, and the United Kingdom.

Columbia Music Video issued Here Is Mariah Carey on VHS in the United States on November 30, 1993. It marked Carey's third video release, following The First Vision (1991) and MTV Unplugged +3 (1992). A week later, the video was released in Canada. Releases in the United Kingdom and France followed in February 1994, Hong Kong in December 1996, and a DVD in 2006. Sony Pictures Entertainment released it for digital download and rental worldwide on December 7, 2021. The video is approximately one hour long and includes more non-concert footage plus the "Dreamlover" music video, which were not shown on the NBC broadcast.

Performances from the concert received releases independent of the Here Is Mariah Carey video. In 1993, Columbia released a CD maxi single of "Hero" which includes audio of Carey's Proctor's Theater performance of the song as the second track. The following year, the label released it as a standalone promotional CD single. In 1994, that of "Dreamlover" was included on certain CD singles and twelve-inch singles alongside "Without You" and "Never Forget You". It was later included on a digital maxi single with other versions of the song. Carey's performances of "Hero" and "Without You" are the songs' music videos.

Critical reception 

Here Is Mariah Carey received positive reviews from critics. Steve Holsey of the Michigan Chronicle considered her vocals impressive, the Lansing State Journals Mike Hughes felt her voice had "moments of luminous beauty", and Steve Morse of The Boston Globe thought she "sings like a songbird". Toronto Star television critic Greg Quill wrote that the performance "affirms her extraordinary vocal abilities". Elaine Lim in the New Straits Times and Roger Catlin in the Hartford Courant agreed that Carey proved she could sing just as well live as in a studio. Morse and Mike Duffy of the Detroit Free Press viewed Carey's rendition of "Without You" as the musical highlight. The latter derided Carey's original songs as dull and derivative, as did Voxs Fred Dellar. Holsey felt Carey lacked the charisma of Whitney Houston or Tina Turner on stage, and author Chris Nickson said she failed to match the versatility Barbra Streisand had in her 1960s television specials.

As well as Carey's performance, critics reviewed the video's production. Hughes thought the concert was perfectly filmed; Quill and Duffy described it as glossy. According to Catlin, the number of cameras and high quality of the audio "make the delivery sound a little artificial". Quill wrote that it lacked a sense of humanity because it was "dominated by technology". Nickson complimented the sound for being "as clear as a studio recording". He and Varietys Adam Sandler viewed the dancers in the "Dreamlover" performance as out of place. Morse found the life of Carey presented in the home movie footage to be an unlikely reality, and Duffy felt the background singers' comments about her were hard to believe. Several viewed the non-concert segments as unrevealing and unimportant. Though she considered them insignificant, Lim felt they added a sense of warmth to Carey. Steve Hall of The Indianapolis Star thought they projected a girl next door image, and Hughes said the scenes made her seem youthful.

Commercial performance 
Here Is Mariah Carey debuted at number 10 on the Billboard Top Music Videos chart for the week ending December 18, 1993. It peaked at number four three weeks later and spent two years on the chart, becoming her longest-charting video. Here Is Mariah Carey was the 10th best-selling video album of 1994 in the United States and ranked at number 27 in 1995. In the United Kingdom, the video debuted at number two on the Official Charts Company's Music Videos chart for the week ending February 26, 1994. It rose to number one the following week, and spent six consecutive weeks atop the chart. Here Is Mariah Carey is certified Platinum by the Recording Industry Association of America in the United States, and Gold in the United Kingdom and France by the British Phonographic Industry and the Syndicat National de l'Édition Phonographique, respectively.

Track listing 
Credits adapted from VHS inner cover.

Credits 
Personnel adapted from DVD closing credits except where noted.

Production 

 Lawrence Jordan – director
 Mariah Carey – executive producer
 Randy Hoffman – producer
 Al Smith – producer
 Walter Afanasieff – music producer
 Jack Gulick – co-producer
 Daniel Pearl – cinematography
 Cabot McMullen – production design
 Steve Cohen – lighting design
 Diane Martel – choreography, director (track 11), home movie footage
 Emilio "Stretch" Austin Jr. – choreography (track 11)
 Patty Lamagna – associate producer
 Judy Minot – editing
 Michael Maloy – editing
 John Alberts – audio post production
 Mike Guzauski – remix engineer
 Mike Scott – assistant remix engineer
 Vinnie Violandi – colorist
 Wyatt Smith – assistant editor
 John Lowe – assistant director
 Kevin Mazur – photography
 Billy B – make-up for Carey
 Sid Curry – hair for Carey
 Basia Zamorska – stylist

Instruments 

 Walter Afanasieff – keyboards
 Dan Shea – keyboards
 Ren Klyce – keyboards
 Vernon Black – guitar
 Randy Jackson – bass guitar
 Gigi Gonaway – drums
 Peter Michael – percussion
 Gary Cirimelli – MIDI keyboard tech
 Laurie Bishop – strings
 Melanie Evans – strings
 Elaine Gervais – strings
 Linda Hanley – strings
 Margaret Hickey – strings
 Karen Russell – strings
 Paula Shaw – strings
 Martha Vivona – strings

Performers 

 Cindy Mizelle – background vocals
 Deborah Cooper – background vocals
 Melonie Daniels – background vocals
 Kelly Price – background vocals
 Shanrae Price – background vocals
 Trey Lorenz – guest vocals
 Refreshing Springs Church Choir – choir
 Emilio "Stretch" Austin Jr. – dancer
 Henry "Link" McMillan – dancer
 Jamel "Loose Joint" Byrd Brown – dancer

Charts

Certifications

Notes

References

Citations

Book sources 

 
 
 
 

1993 live albums
1993 television specials
1993 video albums
Columbia Records video albums
Concert films
Films shot in New York (state)
Live video albums
Mariah Carey video albums
NBC television specials